Rebore, vol. 2 is the second remix album of material by experimental noise rock band Boredoms. It is the second of four in the Rebore series, and is a DJ remix by Ken Ishii that contains samples from Boredoms' entire discography to that point.

Track listing
"Unidentified Freaked-Up Outsteppers (Non-Stop Ki Mix)" – 50:21

Boredoms albums
2000 remix albums
Warner Music Group remix albums